Shuvalovo is a rural locality (a settlement) in Filippovskoye Rural Settlement, Kirzhachsky District, Vladimir Oblast, Russia. The population was 1 as of 2010.

Geography 
Shuvalovo is located 16 km southwest of Kirzhach (the district's administrative centre) by road. Dubki is the nearest rural locality.

References 

Rural localities in Kirzhachsky District